The following Forbes list of Irish billionaires is based on an annual assessment of wealth and assets compiled and published by Forbes magazine in 2021.

2021 Irish Billionaires List

See also
List of billionaires

References

Net worth

Lists of people by wealth
Economy of Ireland-related lists